St. Moritz is a resort town in Switzerland.

St. Moritz, Saint Moritz, or Sankt-Moritz may also refer to:

 Saint Maurice, a Roman military leader and Christian saint.

Places
 St. Moritz (Rhaetian Railway station), St. Moritz, Switzerland
 St. Moritz, Jakarta, Indonesia, a housing development
 Lake St. Moritz, St. Moritz, Switzerland
 Galula, Tanzania, formerly known as St. Moritz
 Hotel St. Moritz, a former hotel in New York City

Other
 St. Moritz, Halle, a church in Halle, Saxony-Anhalt, Germany
 St. Moritz 1928, the 1928 Winter Olympics in St. Moritz, Switzerland
 St. Moritz 1948, the 1948 Winter Olympics in St. Moritz, Switzerland
 Rambler St. Moritz, a 1966 Ramber Classic show car by American Motors
 St Moritz, a nightclub in Wardour Street, London

See also
 
 Saint-Maurice (disambiguation)
 Moritz (disambiguation)